Lieutenant Colonel Edward Major (1615 – c. 1655) was a Virginia soldier, landowner and politician.

Life 
Major was born in England around 1615. He moved to Virginia in 1635 and became a prominent farmer and militia leader in Nansemond County. He was a Burgess from Upper Norfolk Co. in 1645.

Major was closely associated with Puritan settlers in the colony, and was elected Speaker of the House of Burgesses in 1652, just after Virginia acceded to the authority of Parliament following the execution of King Charles I.

Major married Susannah Aston, daughter of Lt. Col. Walter Aston. After Edward Major's death, Susannah had married William Batt (William Batte) by December 4, 1656.

Notes

References

1615 births
1655 deaths
Speakers of the Virginia House of Burgesses
Politicians from Suffolk, Virginia
English emigrants